The Roraiman barbtail (Roraimia adusta) is a species of bird in the family Furnariidae. Therein, it is placed in the monotypic genus Roraimia. It is found in highland forest in the tepuis of southern Venezuela, western Guyana and far northern Brazil. Its name refers to Mount Roraima. It is a small bird with rufous upperparts, streaky underparts, a white throat and a black mask.

References

Roraiman barbtail
Birds of Venezuela
Roraiman barbtail
Roraiman barbtail
Roraiman barbtail
Taxonomy articles created by Polbot
Birds of the Tepuis